Rashid Adewumi Aderinoye (born 9 October 1950) is a Nigerian professor of literacy and open distance learning, former Deputy Executive Secretary, Universal Basic Education Commission (UBEC) and Executive Secretary, National Commission for Nomadic Education (NCNE). He was a former head of the Department of Adult Education, University of Ibadan, Nigeria.

Early life and education 
Aderinoye was born in Ifetedo, Osun state, to the family of Pa Sakariyau Aderinoye and Mama Sabitiu Ajimoti Aderinoye. He started his educational journey at Ansar-ur-Deen primary school, Ifetedo and obtained Grade II Teacher Certificate from Ansar-ur-Deen Teacher Training College Ota. Thereafter, he proceeded to the University of Ibadan to study Adult Education and Islamic Studies. He earned a Bachelor of Education (B.Ed.) Degree in 1982, a Master of Education (M.Ed.) Degree in 1984 and Doctoral of Philosophy (Ph.D.) in 1992 from the same institution.

Career 
He joined the academic staff of the Department of Adult Education, University of Ibadan on 23 June 1993 as Lecturer II, and became a Professor in 2007. He presented the University of Ibadan Inaugural Lecture on 5 July 2018.

He has served in different capacities outside the university most especially UNESCO programmes on promotion of literacy. He has also served in government in various capacities: he was a member of defunct Oyo State Muslim Pilgrims Welfare Board, 1986–89; Osun State Pilgrims Welfare Board, 1994–1996. He was appointed Deputy Executive Secretary, Universal Basic Education Commission (UBEC) from 2010 to 2013 and Executive Secretary, National Commission for Nomadic Education (NCNE) from 2014 to 2016. Also secretary Ministerial Committee on Madrasah Education 2010–2014.

Aderinoye is an expert in literacy education this is evident in one of the book written in his honour titled "Literacy for sustainable development in a knowledge economy"  and a member of the Nigerian Academy of Education.

Professor Rasheed Aderinoye, takes a dignified bow from the premier University of Ibadan on October 9, 2020, upon the attainment of 70 years.

Selected publications
source:
 Aderinoye, R.A. (1997): Literacy Education in Nigeria, Ibadan, Ibadan University Press, 170 pages
 Aderinoye  R.A.  (2015) Arisekola  in  our  Minds;  A  Compendium  of  Tributes. Crafted  and Bond  Words work 202pg
 Aderinoye R. A. (1990) Cultural preservation and the responsibilities of Adult Instructors in Michael Omolewa, Adeola A.O.,  Akomolede  F.A.O. The Open Door:  Teaching them to teach their peers Ibadan IFESH pages 36–432.
 Aderinoye,  R.  A.  (1995)  "The  National  Teachers"  Institute  Experience  in  Distance Education  in  Omolewa  Micheal,  Adekanmbi  Gbolagade  eds  University  Initiatives  in Adult Education Ibadan, University Press, pages 127-14
 Aderinoye R.A. (2018)  Education: a Vaccine for the Development of Africa, A Keynote Address  at  International  Conference  of  University  of  Nairobi  College  of  Education  and External Studies Oct 201824.
 Aderinoye  R.A.  (2018)  Adult  Education  and  ICT  as  tools  for  promoting  democrative ideals: a participatory  experience. A  Key note Addressat the 2018 National Conference of Nigerian National Council of Adult Education Nov. 2018
 Aderinoye R. A. (1997) Adult Functional Literacy Learner's Manual Ibadan, ARFH
 Omolewa, M.; Fadeyi, T. & Aderinoye, R. A. (2000): "Literacy and NFE: Tools for Empowerment".  Journal  of  ADEA,Commonwealth  Secretariat,  Swiss  Agency  for Development and Cooperation, UNESCO, September No. 5. pp. 11–12
 Aderinoye, R. A. (2007), Mass Literacy in Nigeria: Efforts  and Challenges in Journal of the Community and Adult Education Society of Nigeria (CARESON) Vol.  5, No 1
 Aderinoye R. A. (2019). Prof, PAI Obanya's Role in Nigerian Education in UMO Ivowi, Educating for Functionality NAE, foremost Educational Services Ltd.52.
 Aderinoye  R.  A.  (2019). Research  on  Contemporary  Issues  in  Media  Resources  and Information  and  Communication  Technology  Use.A  Festschrift  in  honour  of  Professor Iyabo Motolagbe Mabawonku. Hubert  Charles,  Berhe  Constantinos,  Iyabo  Fagbulu,  Gesa Kupfer,
 Rashid  Aderinoye (2003) Education Sector's Response to HIV/AIDS IN NIGERIA: Report and Framework for Action, Abuja, FME, UNESCO, UNAIDS.

References 

1950 births
Living people
Academic staff of the University of Ibadan